Pleurotus tuber-regium, the king tuber mushroom, is an edible gilled fungus native to the tropics, including Africa, Asia, and Australasia. It has been shown to be a distinct species incapable of cross-breeding and phylogenetically removed from other species of Pleurotus.

Pleurotustuber-regium is a saprotroph found on dead wood, including Daniellia trees in Africa. As the fungus consumes the wood, it produces a sclerotium, or storage tuber, either within the decaying wood or in the underlying soil. These sclerotia are round, dark brown with white interiors, and up to 30 cm wide. The fruiting bodies then emerge from the sclerotium. Both the sclerotium and the fruiting bodies are edible.

In addition to being saprotrophic, P. tuber-regium is also nematophagous, catching nematodes by paralyzing them with a toxin.

Pleurotus tuber-regium has a history of economic importance in Africa as food and as a medicinal mushroom. Industrial cultivation is not yet common, but studies have shown P. tuber-regium can be grown on organic wastes such as corn, sawdust, cardboard. Mycelial growth occurs between 15 °C and 40 °C, with an optimum growth rate at 35 °C. A recent study demonstrated that polysaccharides of P. tuber-regium are able to delay the progression of diabetes and associated complications in rats with insulin resistance.

Pleurotus tuber-regium can degrade polyethylene film.

References

External links
 
 Biological Species in Pleurotus: ISG X. Pleurotus tuber-regium at University of Tennessee-Knoxville Mycology Lab
 Pleurotus tuber-regium Google Images (www.google.com/images)

Pleurotaceae
Fungi of Africa
Fungi of Asia
Edible fungi
Carnivorous fungi
Fungi in cultivation